Bilu may refer to:
 Bilu, Baneh
 Bilu, Marivan